B. G. Prasada Rao (Bollam Gnana Prasada Rao; 1916–1998) was the third successor of Frank Whittaker as Bishop in Medak.

Studies
Prasada Rao studied theology at the United Theological College, Bengaluru between 1941 and 1945 along with Joshua Russell Chandran and Stanley Jedidiah Samartha, and again between 1953 and 1956 when he undertook an M.Th.

Leadership
When the Evangelist  A. B. Masilamani retired as the Auxiliary Secretary of the Bible Society of India Andhra Pradesh Auxiliary, Prasada Rao was appointed in 1969 by rural Pastor, A. E. Inbanathan, the then General Secretary of the Bible Society of India.  Then Bishop - in - Medak, H. D. L. Abraham loaned the services of Prasada Rao to the Bible Society of India.  It was during Prasada Rao's tenure at the Bible Society of India that Common Language Translation of the Telugu Bible (Old Testament) was undertaken by Suppogu Israel and G. Babu Rao.  Incidentally, G. Babu Rao later became the Auxiliary Secretary between 1998 and 2001.
In 1975, H. D. L. Abraham retired from the Bishopric of Medak on reaching superannuation.  B. G. Prasada Rao also contested the vacant Bishopric and was declared elected by the then Moderator of the Synod of the Church of South India, N. D. Ananda Rao Samuel.

Prasada Rao was principally consecrated in 1976 by N. D. Ananda Rao Samuel, then Moderator.

In 1981, Prasada Rao retired from the Bishopric on reaching superannuation and became Coordinator and Director for the Haggai Institute of World Evangelism.

References
Notes

Further reading
 
 
 

Telugu people
Anglican bishops of Medak
20th-century Anglican bishops in India
Indian Christian theologians
Senate of Serampore College (University) alumni
1916 births
1998 deaths
20th-century translators
Anglican biblical scholars
Indian biblical scholars
Church of South India clergy